The Bishop of Guildford is the Ordinary of the Church of England Diocese of Guildford in the Province of Canterbury.

The title had first appeared as a suffragan See in the Diocese of Winchester in 1874. The Bishop suffragan of Guildford assisted the Bishop of Winchester in overseeing that diocese. Under George V, the Diocese of Guildford was created out of the north-eastern part of the Diocese of Winchester in 1927.

The diocese covers the western half of the County of Surrey. The see is in the town of Guildford where the seat is located at the Cathedral Church of the Holy Spirit which was built as a cathedral 1936 to 1965. The bishop's residence is Willow Grange, Jacobs Well — to the north of Guildford.

The incumbent bishop is Andrew Watson, 10th Bishop of Guildford, since the confirmation of his election on 24 November 2014.

List of bishops

Assistant bishops
Among those who have served as assistant bishops of the diocese have been:
19301955 (d.): Cyril Golding-Bird, Archdeacon of Dorking (until 1936), then of Surrey (until 1949); former Bishop of Kalgoorlie and of Mauritius
In 1952, Freddy Hawkes, Bishop suffragan of Kingston, retired to Oxted. He did some bishop's work in retirement, such as an ordination in 1956.
19551967 (res.): Basil Dale, Rector of Haslemere (1955–1962), full-time assistant bishop (1962–1967) and former Bishop of Jamaica
19631983 (res.): St John Pike, Vicar of Ewshot (1963–1971), Vicar of Botleys with Lyne and Long Cross (1971–1983) and former Bishop of Gambia and the Rio Pongas
19641972 (ret.): Lucian Usher-Wilson, Vicar of Churt and former Bishop of Mbale

References 

 Whitaker's Almanack to 2004, Joseph Whitaker and Sons Ltd/A&C Black, London

Guildford
 
Bishops of Guildford